The Leader of the Free Democratic Party is the most senior and leading political figure within the Free Democratic Party (FDP), a centre-right and liberal political party in Germany with parliamentary representation. The Free Democratic Party (FDP) is, historically, also one of the most significant political parties in Germany. Since 6 December 2013, the office has been held by Christian Lindner, who succeeded Philipp Rösler.

The Leader of the Free Democratic Party is supported by a General Secretary who, since 19 September 2020, has been Volker Wissing.

List 

 Leaders of the Free Democratic Party

References 

Free Democratic Party
Lists of German politicians
Free Democratic Party (Germany) politicians